Divina Estrella (born 20 October 1956) is a Dominican Republic sprinter. She competed in the 100 metres at the 1976 Summer Olympics and the 1984 Summer Olympics. She was the first woman to represent the Dominican Republic at the Olympics.

References

External links
 

1956 births
Living people
Athletes (track and field) at the 1976 Summer Olympics
Athletes (track and field) at the 1984 Summer Olympics
Athletes (track and field) at the 1979 Pan American Games
Dominican Republic female sprinters
Olympic athletes of the Dominican Republic
Pan American Games competitors for the Dominican Republic
Place of birth missing (living people)
Olympic female sprinters
20th-century Dominican Republic women